FinBank or Finbank may refer to:

 FinBank Burundi, a commercial bank in Burundi
 FinBank Nigeria, a defunct commercial bank in Nigeria that was purchased and assimilated by First City Monument Bank in 2012